R Serpentis is a Mira variable type star in the equatorial constellation of Serpens. It ranges between apparent magnitude 5.16 and 14.4, and spectral types M5e to M8e, over a period of 356.41 days. The variability of this star was discovered in 1826 by Karl Ludwig Harding.

References

M-type giants
Mira variables
Serpens (constellation)
Durchmusterung objects
141850
077615
5894
Serpentis, R